Atlin Lake (Lingít: Áa Tlein) is the largest natural lake in the Canadian province of British Columbia. The northern tip of the lake is in Yukon, as is Little Atlin Lake. However, most of the lake lies within the Atlin District of British Columbia.  Atlin Lake is generally considered to be the source of the Yukon River although it is drained via the short Atlin River into Tagish Lake. Atlin Lake was named by the Tlingit First Nation people of the region. 

The name comes from Áa Tlein (in Canadian spelling Â Tłèn), the Tlingit name meaning simply "big lake".

The community of Atlin, British Columbia, is located on the eastern shore of the lake. The southern part of the lake is in the Atlin Provincial Park and Recreation Area.

See also
 Atlin Mountain

References

External links

Atlin District
Lakes of British Columbia
Lakes of Yukon
Tlingit
Yukon River